Allen Henry "Mal" Elward (June 23, 1892 – December 31, 1982) was an American football player, coach of football and basketball, and college athletics administrator.  He served as the head football coach at Grinnell College from 1922 to 1923, at John Carroll University from 1924 to 1926, and at Purdue University from 1937 to 1941, compiling a career college football record of 32–42–8.  Elward was also the head basketball coach at John Carroll from 1924 to 1927, tallying a mark of 22–24.  He was the athletic director at Purdue in 1941.  Elward played football as an end at the University of Notre Dame from 1912 to 1915.  He served as an assistant football coach at Purdue from 1927 to 1936 and at Stanford University from 1946 to 1956.

Elward also served as the head coach of the 1942 Lakehurst Naval Air Station Blimps football team.

Head coaching record

Football

References

1892 births
1982 deaths
American football ends
Grinnell Pioneers football coaches
John Carroll Blue Streaks football coaches
John Carroll Blue Streaks men's basketball coaches
Lakehurst Naval Air Station Blimps football coaches
Notre Dame Fighting Irish football players
Purdue Boilermakers athletic directors
Purdue Boilermakers football coaches
Stanford Cardinal football coaches
United States Army Air Service pilots of World War I